The Sinh (Tai Nuea: ᥔᥤᥢᥲ), or commonly, is a handmade traditional skirt, often made of silk, that are worn by Lao women and Thai women, particularly northern Thai and northeastern Thai women. It is a tube skirt. Its pattern can indicate which region the wearer is from. In present-day Thailand, pha sins are typically worn at special events. However, in Laos, Sinhs are worn more regularly in daily life.

Components

A sinh is typically composed of three components:
 , literally 'the head of the sinh', is the waistband portion, which is typically tucked in and hidden.
This part of the sinh is typically not detailed. In particular, it typically only consists of one or two colors.
 , literally 'the foot of the sinh', is the hem. The hem is typically woven with a lot of details. The specific details of the hem can indicate where the sinh is made.

Textiles
The sinh is made of silk or handwoven cotton. They come in different textures and designs, frequently created in rural areas. Premium silk versions may go for over 50,000 baht per piece, particularly if created by a well-known traditional weaver. Less expensive fabrics cost about 3,000 baht.

Gallery

See also
Longyi
Pathin
Sampot
Sarong
Traditional Thai clothing
Xout lao

References

Further reading

External links
Sinhs (Lao skirt fabric)
Why Must Lao Girls Wear A Sinh To University
Lao Identity

Skirts
Folk costumes
Laotian clothing
Thai clothing